Novaya Usman is a rural locality (a selo) and the administrative center of Novousmansky District of Voronezh Oblast, Russia. Population:

References

Notes

Sources

Rural localities in Novousmansky District
Voronezhsky Uyezd